The 2011 Memorial Cup was a four-team round-robin format ice hockey tournament played from May 20–29, 2011 in Mississauga, Ontario. It was the 93rd annual Memorial Cup competition and determined the major junior ice hockey champion of the Canadian Hockey League (CHL). The Ontario Hockey League (OHL) announced on May 10, 2010 that the Mississauga St. Michael's Majors were chosen to host the event at the Hershey Centre. Other tournament participants included the Owen Sound Attack from the Ontario Hockey League (OHL), the Saint John Sea Dogs from the Quebec Major Junior Hockey League (QMJHL) and the Kootenay Ice from the Western Hockey League (WHL).

The Majors won the right to host the event over the Barrie Colts, Kingston Frontenacs and Windsor Spitfires.

The Saint John Sea Dogs defeated the Mississauga St. Michael's Majors 3–1 in the final to win the title for the first time, and as a result, became the first team based in Canada's Maritime Provinces to win the Memorial Cup.

Round-robin Standings

Schedule
All times local (UTC −5)

Round Robin

Playoff round

Statistical leaders

Skaters

GP = Games played; G = Goals; A = Assists; Pts = Points; PIM = Penalty minutes

Goaltending

This is a combined table of the top goaltenders based on goals against average and save percentage with at least sixty minutes played. The table is sorted by GAA.

GP = Games played; W = Wins; L = Losses; SA = Shots against; GA = Goals against; GAA = Goals against average; SV% = Save percentage; SO = Shutouts; TOI = Time on ice (minutes:seconds)

Rosters

Mississauga St. Michael's Majors (Host/OHL)
Head coach: Dave Cameron

Owen Sound Attack (OHL)
Head coach:Mark Reeds

Kootenay Ice (WHL)
Head coach: Kris Knoblauch

Saint John Sea Dogs (QMJHL)
Head coach: Gerard Gallant

Awards
Stafford Smythe Memorial Trophy (MVP) – Jonathan Huberdeau (Saint John Sea Dogs)
Ed Chynoweth Trophy (Leading Scorer) – Andrew Shaw (Owen Sound Attack)
George Parsons Trophy (Sportsmanlike) – Marc Cantin (Mississauga St. Michael's Majors)
Hap Emms Memorial Trophy (Top Goalie) – Jordan Binnington (Owen Sound Attack)
All-Star Team:
Goaltender: Jordan Binnington (Owen Sound Attack)
Defence: Stuart Percy (Mississauga St. Michael's Majors), Nathan Beaulieu (Saint John Sea Dogs)
Forwards: Andrew Shaw (Owen Sound Attack), Devante Smith-Pelly (Mississauga St. Michael's Majors), Jonathan Huberdeau (Saint John Sea Dogs)

Road to the Cup

OHL playoffs

QMJHL playoffs

WHL playoffs

References

External links
 Memorial Cup
 Canadian Hockey League

Memorial Cup tournaments
Memorial Cup 2011
Memorial Cup 2011
2011 in Ontario